Terrain is the sixth studio album by Portico Quartet. It was released on 28 May 2021.

Track listing 
All songs are written by Duncan Bellamy and Jack Wyllie.
 "I" – 19:18
 "II" – 9:16
 "III" – 10:10

Personnel 
Portico Quartet
 Duncan Bellamy – drums, electric bass, hang drums, synthesiser, piano, vocals, sampler, vibraphone
 Jack Wyllie – saxophone, piano, synthesiser, sampler, string arrangements

Additional musicians
 Francesca Ter-Berg – cello on "I", "II"
 Simmy Singh – violin on "I"
 Pete Bennie – double bass on "I"

Production
 Mixed by Greg Freeman, Duncan Bellamy and Jack Wyllie in Berlin, 2020.
 Mastering and vinyl cut by John Davis at Metropolis, London.
 Design and photography by Veil Projects.

References 

2021 albums
Portico Quartet albums